The Detroit Diesel is a series of Diesel V8 engines first introduced by General Motors for their C/K pickup trucks in 1982. The engine family was produced by GM through 2000, when it was replaced by the new Duramax line. AM General's subsidiary General Engine Products (GEP) still produces a military variant of this engine for the HMMWV.

The General Motors light-truck 6.2 L and 6.5 L Diesel engines were optional in all 1982 through 2000 full-size GM pickups, SUVs, and vans: Chevrolet C/K pickup trucks, Chevrolet Suburban, Chevrolet K5 Blazer and its replacement Chevrolet Tahoe, full-size Chevrolet Van and its successor Chevrolet Express, as well as motor homes.  The engine was standard on AM General military HMMWV, civilian Hummer H1, and the 1980s GM military Commercial Utility Cargo Vehicle.

6.2L

The original  diesel V8 was introduced in 1982 for the Chevrolet C/K and was produced until 1993. The 6.2 L diesel emerged as a high-MPG alternative to the V8 gasoline engine lineup, and achieved better mileage than the General Motors 4.3 L V6 gasoline engines of the 1980s, at a time when the market was focused on power rather than efficiency. However, it was designed to easily install in place of the gasoline V8, using the same mounting and attachments for transmissions as all GM truck engines. Overall weight for the complete engine is slightly heavier than the 7.4 L gasoline engine. There were about 300 6.2 diesel engines which were placed into 2 door cars in 1981, prior to official production. These were then given to the United States government and issued to various federal agencies and military branches. These were used as testbeds regarding long term fuel economy and reliability in cars.

Applications
 1981 Chevrolet Impala Sport Coupe (only available with upgraded suspension).
 1982–1993 Chevrolet/GMC C/K 1500, 2500, 3500
 1992–1993 AM General Hummer H1
 1982–1993 AM General HMMWV
 GM version of the CUCV
 1982–1993 Chevrolet Van

Specifications
 Engine RPO codes: LH6 ('C' series, with EGR / EPR) and LL4 ('J' series)
 Displacement: 
 Bore × stroke: 
 Block / Head: Cast iron / Cast iron
 Aspiration: Natural
 Valvetrain: OHV 16-valve
 Compression: 21.5:1
 Injection: Indirect
 Horsepower / Torque (at launch):  at 3,600 rpm /  at 2,000 rpm
 Horsepower / Torque (final):  at 3,600 rpm /  at 2,000 rpm
 Horsepower / Torque (US Army HMMWV model):  at 3,600 rpm /  at 2,100 rpm
 Max RPMs: 3,600 rpm
 Idle RPMs: 550 ± 25

6.5L

The  version was introduced in 1992 to replace the 6.2. Most 6.5s are equipped with a turbo. This engine was never meant to be a power and torque competitor with Ford/International and Dodge/Cummins, but rather a simply designed workhorse engine that made credible power, achieved decent fuel economy and met emission standards in half-ton trucks. The Duramax 6600 replaced the 6.5 in light trucks beginning in 2001 and the C3500HD medium duty cab and chassis (replaced by C4500 Kodiak/Topkick) and vans beginning in 2003, but the 6.5 (6500 Optimizer) is still produced by AM General for the HMMWV.

There are several GM 6.5-liter diesel engine production options. The Turbocharged L56, (VIN "S") was used in most light duty 3/4 ton (2500). Heavy duty 3/4 ton and 1 ton trucks used the Turbocharged L65 (VIN "F") engine. The L56 is emissions controlled with EGR and catalytic converters. The L65 engine has no EGR, and has no catalytic converter. There is a soot trap on L65 engines that is often mistaken for a catalytic converter. GM was the first manufacturer to introduce an electronically controlled fuel injection system into a diesel pickup truck. The L49 (VIN "P") and L57 are both naturally aspirated engines. L57 is listed as HO or Heavy Duty. Additional RPO codes are LQM  and LQN .

Changes were made by GM to the 6.5 in their light trucks for emissions or reliability improvement. The 1992-1993 model years used a 6.5-specific Stanadyne DB-2 mechanical injection pump. GM replaced the DB-2 with the electronic throttle DS-4 in 1994-2000 vehicles. In mid-1996 GM implemented a redesigned engine cooling system incorporating twin non bypass-blocking thermostats and a  water pump. This improved the flow through the block by 70–75% and flow to the radiator 7%.

Applications 
(6.5 diesel only)
 1994 - 1999 Chevy Blazer/ 2-door Tahoe / GMC Yukon/Chevy K-1500, K-2500, K-3500
 1994 - 1999 Chevrolet Suburban / GMC Suburban / Holden Suburban
 1992 - 1999 Chevrolet and GMC C/K
 2001 Chevrolet and GMC C-3500HD
 1994 - 2004 AM General Hummer H1
 1994 - present AM General HMMWV
 1994 - 1995 Chevrolet and GMC G Van (naturally aspirated)
 1999 - 2001 Workhorse Custom Chassis [Light and Medium Duty Forward Control Chassis] P42 Commercial, P32 Motor Home

Specifications

 Engine RPO Codes: L49, L56, L57, L65, LQM, and LQN.
 Displacement: 
 Bore x Stroke: 
 Block / Head: Cast iron / Cast iron
 Aspiration: Turbocharged (Borg-Warner GM-X series)  Also available naturally aspirated.
 Valvetrain: OHV 2-V
 Compression: GM Early 21.3:1, GM Late 20.3:1, AMG/GEP Marine 18.0:1
 Injection: Indirect
 Power / Torque (lowest):  at 3,600 rpm /  at 1,700 rpm (naturally aspirated)
 Power / Torque (highest):  at 3,200 rpm /  at 1,800 rpm (turbocharged)
 Max RPMs: 3,600

Fuel system

The fuel system is a very simple design. A mechanical or electric fuel lift pump feeds a Stanadyne Rotary Distributor Injection pump at low pressure. The distributor injection pump controls both metering, via an internal centrifugal governor, and high pressure fuel delivery to the fuel injectors via internal precision hydraulic pumps. Near the top of the compression stroke fuel is atomized at high pressure into a hemispherical Inconel prechamber in the cylinder heads using Bosch pintle and seat mechanical fuel injectors. This is called Indirect injection. GM used fully mechanical DB2 series injection pumps on all military HMMWVs and 1982-1993 6.2s and 6.5s. From 1994 until end of production, GM used the electronically controlled Stanadyne DS4 series of injection pumps in their light trucks. A mechanical DB4 series injection pump can be found on some 6.5L marine engines.

Common problems

Main Bearing Web Crack: In both 6.2L and 6.5L engines this is reportedly fixed with a combination of improved higher nickel cast iron alloy and lower block re-design including, but not limited to, a main bearing girdle. These features are in the new for 2007 AM General GEP P400 6500 Optimizer enhanced 6.5L diesel presently being sold to the US Government for the 6 ton armored HMMWV.
Crank Failure: Related to age failures of the harmonic balancer, the vibration-dampened accessory drive pulley, or the dual mass flywheel.
Pump Mounted Driver: Relates to thermal failures. The PMD is screwed to the DS-4 injection pump on the 1994-2001 GM 6.5 diesel utilizing fuel flow to dissipate heat. The injection pump is mounted in the intake valley (a high heat area). The PMD contains two power transistors that should be cooled by proper contact with the injection pump body. If the pump is not precisely machined to make complete contact with the transistors via the silicone thermal gasket and paste, the PMD is improperly installed without the gasket or paste, the PMD is installed off center with the pump body, or corrosion develops on the mounting surface the PMD will overheat. Several companies manufacture an extension harness and heat-sink kits. These allow an owner or their mechanic to relocate the PMD away from the injection pump to a lower heat environment and/or a place that can get more air flow.
Cylinder Head Cracking: higher mileage 6.5 engines can exhibit stress related fractures in the cylinder head bowl. Stronger cylinder heads remedy this problem.
Oil Cooler Line Failure: Stock 1990s G.M. oil cooler lines are held together by a "C Clip" at the engine block and since the engine has no low oil pressure shutoff switch, if one clip fails the engine loses its oil and seizes. Aftermarket oil cooler lines that utilize compression fittings rectify this.

See also

 List of GM engines
 Duramax V8 engine

References

External links
DB2 Injection Pump

General Motors engines
Detroit Diesel engines
Marine diesel engines
Diesel engines by model
V8 engines